The Tarapaca Pacific iguana (Microlophus tarapacensis) is a species of lizard in the family Tropiduridae.
It is endemic to Chile.

References

tarapacensis
Lizards of South America
Endemic fauna of Chile
Reptiles of Chile
Reptiles described in 1966
Taxa named by Roberto Donoso-Barros
Taxonomy articles created by Polbot